São Tomé and Príncipe has a multi-party system.

The parties

Parliamentary parties

Other parties
Liberal Democratic Order (Ordem Liberal Democrata)
Force for Change Democratic Movement – Liberal Party (Movimento Democrático das Forças da Mudança – Partido Liberal)
Christian Democratic Front (Frente Democrática Cristã)
São Toméan Workers Party (Partido Trabalhista Santomense)
Social Liberal Party (Partido Liberal Social)(defunct)
Uê Kédadji coalition (defunct)
Democratic Renovation Party (Partido da Renovação Democrática)
National Union for Democracy and Progress (União Nacional para a Democracia e Progresso)
Opposition Democratic Coalition (Coligaçao Democrática da Oposiçao)
People's Party of Progress (Partido Popular do Progresso)
Social Renewal Party (Partido da Renovação Social)
National Platform for Development (Plataforma Nacional para Desenvolvimento)
Stability and Social Progress Party (Partido da Estabilidade e Progresso Social)
Social Democratic Movement - Green Party of São Tomé and Príncipe (Movimento Social Democrata - Partido Verde São Tomé and Príncipe)

Exiled political parties (defunct)
Independent Democratic Union of São Tomé and Príncipe (União Democrãtica Independente de São Tomé e Príncipe)
National Democratic Action of São Tomé and Príncipe (Acção Democrática Nacional de São Tomé e Príncipe)
National Resistance Front of São Tomé and Príncipe (Frente de Resistência Nacional de São Tomé e Príncipe)
National Resistance Front of São Tomé and Príncipe-Renewal (Frente de Resistência Nacional de São Tomé e Príncipe-Renovada)

See also
Politics of São Tomé and Príncipe
List of political parties by country

References

Sao Tome and Principe
 
Political parties
Sao Tome and Principe
Political parties